The Colony is a reality television series that is produced by the Discovery Channel. The program follows a group of people who must survive in a simulated post-apocalyptic environment.

Casting was done by Metal Flowers Media.  The first season had 10 main cast members as well as almost 100 actors who did additional scripted and improvisational work for the show.

Seasons

Season 1

The first season was filmed at and around 516 S Anderson St, Los Angeles, CA 90033, and follows ten cast members in an environment that simulates life after the collapse of civilization due to a catastrophic epidemic. The volunteers tend to many aspects of sustainable living including the essentials: water, electricity, security and food. Insights into psychology, security, and technology are also given by experts. The season first aired on the Discovery Channel on July 21, 2009. Filming began on February 28, and ran until April 28, 2009.

Season 2

Season 2 was filmed at and around 300-498 Southern Place, Chalmette, Louisiana 70043, and follows ten cast members in an environment that simulates life after a global viral outbreak.  The season first aired on July 27, 2010.

See also
 Robinsonade
 :Category:Works about survival skills

References

Further reading 
 
 
Interview with John Cohn on The Linux Link Tech Show

External links

Official Page of Discovery Canada

Discovery Channel original programming
2000s American reality television series
2010s American reality television series
2009 American television series debuts
Post-apocalyptic television series
Works about survival skills
2010 American television series endings